Portage Township is an inactive township in New Madrid County, in the U.S. state of Missouri.

Portage Township was established in 1874, taking its name from Portage Bayou.

References

Townships in Missouri
Townships in New Madrid County, Missouri